Don Bernardino Fernández de Velasco, 1st Duke of Frías, Grandee of Spain (c. 1450 – 9 February 1512) was a Spanish nobleman and prominent military figure of the last stages of the Reconquista.

Fernández de Velasco was born in Burgos, the son of Don Pedro Fernández de Velasco, 2nd Count of Haro, Constable of Castille, and of Doña Mencía de Mendoza y Figueroa, herself a daughter of the illustrious Marquis of Santillana.

He participated in the conquest of Granada, where his father died, and became one of its firsts Viceroys. On 20 March 1492 he was granted the title of Duke of Frías by the Catholic Monarchs.

He first married Doña Blanca de Herrera, Lady of Pedraza de la Sierra, with whom he had a daughter, Ana Herrera de Velasco, who married the Count-Duke of Benavente.

After becoming a widow, he married secondly Doña Juana de Aragón, Lady of Castilnovo, an illegitimate daughter of King Ferdinand II of Aragon, with whom he had another daughter, Doña Juliana de Velasco y Aragón, 1st Countess of Castilnovo, and future consort Duchess of Frías by her marriage to her cousin.

He had no legitimate male issue, so his titles passed on to his younger brother Don Íñigo Fernández de Velasco, 2nd Duke of Frías.

Sources

1450 births
1512 deaths
Spanish viceroys
101
103
Bernardino
Bernardino 01
15th-century Castilians
Grandees of Spain